Döbris is a former municipality in the Burgenlandkreis district, in Saxony-Anhalt, Germany. Since 1 July 2009, it is part of the town Zeitz.

Former municipalities in Saxony-Anhalt
Zeitz